Amaranth is the first studio album of the South Korean duo Davichi, released on January 28, 2008. Actress Lee Mi-yeon and former labelmate Lee Hyori starred in the music video for their debut single, "I Love You Even Though I Hate You". Many producers contributed to the album, including Cho Young-soo, Ahn Min-young, and Park Geun-tae.

Promotion
Davichi chose not to appear in the music video for their debut single "I Love You Even Though I Hate You" and instead released a seven-minute-long mini drama directed by Cha Eun-taek. The plot of the music video was inspired by the movie Thelma & Louise. The song was produced by esteemed balladist Ryu Jae-hyun, who also produced several songs for artists such as Vibe, SG Wannabe, and F.T. Island.

Their next single, "Sad Promise" was re-released as a remixed dance single, giving the opportunity for Davichi to showcase a more lively side of themselves. The music video was a continuation of their previous release and again featured Lee Mi-yeon and Lee Hyori.

After a short break, a repackage of the album was released, titled, Vivid Summer Edition. The repackage included two new songs and a remix of previous single "Sad Promise". Singer Haha lent his vocals to the single "Love and War", an upbeat pop-dance song. On the music video of "Love and War", Ham Jae-hee (함재희) an actor, Hong Jin-young (홍진영) an actress and Song Ji-in (송지인) an actress appeared. The single became a hit and the duo was awarded number ones on Music Bank, M! Countdown, and Inkigayo.

Track listing
From Naver Music.

Vivid Summer edition
From Naver Music.

References

2008 debut albums
Davichi albums